Dazio is a comune (municipality) in the Province of Sondrio in the Italian region Lombardy, located about  northeast of Milan and about  west of Sondrio.

Dazio borders the following municipalities: Ardenno, Civo, Morbegno, Talamona.

Demographic evolution

References

Cities and towns in Lombardy